Break is the third studio album by gothic rock band One-Eyed Doll. It was released on 20 March 2010 and is considered by many One-Eyed Doll's "breakthrough" album. The album is significantly darker than previous releases.

Track listing

Personnel 

Guitar, Vocals - Kimberly Freeman
Drums, Keys, Bass - Junior (Jason Rufuss Sewell)

References 

2010 albums